Volleyball has been played consistently at the Mediterranean Games since the year 1959 for men and since the year 1975 for women . The Italy men's national volleyball team are the most successful men's team and also the Italy women's national volleyball team is the most successful team for women.

Men's tournaments

Men's medals summary

Women's tournaments

Women's medals summary

All-time medal table

See also
Volleyball at the Summer Olympics
Volleyball at the Summer Universiade

References

External links 
 Mediterranean Games - Men's Volley ball (goalzz.com)
 Mediterranean Games - Women's Volley ball (goalzz.com)

 
V
Mediterranean Games